Ponticoccus marisrubri  is a Gram-negative, aerobic, moderately halophilic and non-motile bacterium from the genus Ponticoccus which has been isolated from seawater from the Erba Deep from the Red Sea.

References 

Rhodobacteraceae
Bacteria described in 2017